The 5th Cinemalaya Independent Film Festival was held from July 17 until 26, 2009 in Metro Manila, Philippines.

Entries
The winning film is highlighted with boldface and a dagger.

Full-Length Features

Short films

Awards

Full-Length Features
 Best Film - Last Supper No. 3 by Veronica Velasco
 Special Jury Prize - 
Ang Panggagahasa kay Fe by Alvin Yapan
Colorum by Jobin Ballesteros
 Audience Award - Dinig Sana Kita by Mike Sandejas
 Best Direction - G.B. Sampedro for Squalor
 Best Actor - Lou Veloso for Colorum
 Best Actress - Ina Feleo for Sanglaan
 Best Supporting Actor - Arnold Reyes for Squalor
 Best Supporting Actress - Tessie Tomas for Sanglaan
 Best Screenplay - Vic Acedillo for Ang Nerseri
 Best Cinematography - Pao Orendain for 24K
 Best Sound - Ditoy Aguila, Junel Valencia for Squalor
 Best Editing - Charliebebs Gohetia for Squalor
 Best Original Music Score - Francis Reyes for Dinig Sana Kita
 Best Production Design - Benjamin Padero for Mangatyanan
 Special Citation - Engkwentro by Pepe Diokno
 NETPAC Award - Bakal Boys by Ralston Jover
 National Council for Children's Television Award - Dinig Sana Kita by Mike Sandejas

Short Films
 Best Short Film - Bonsai by Borgy Torre
 Special Jury Prize - Blogog by Rommel Tolentino
 Audience Award - Tatang by Jean Paolo Hernandez
 Best Direction - Dexter B. Cayanes for Musa
 Best Screenplay - Mark Philipp Espina for Behind Closed Doors

References

External links
Cinemalaya Independent Film Festival

Cinemalaya Independent Film Festival
Cinemal
Cinemal
2009 in Philippine cinema